Veľké Ozorovce is a village and municipality in the Trebišov District in the Košice Region of south-eastern Slovakia.

History
In historical records the village was first mentioned in 1304.

Geography
The village lies at an altitude of 180 metres and covers an area of 13.77 km2.
It has a population of about 715 people.

Ethnicity
The village is about 95% Slovak.

Facilities
The village has a public library.

External links
https://web.archive.org/web/20070513023228/http://www.statistics.sk/mosmis/eng/run.html

Villages and municipalities in Trebišov District